Filip Stoilović (born 11 October 1992) is a Serbian volleyball player, who plays as an outside hitter for  VK Jihostroj České Budějovice and the Serbia men's national volleyball team.

Career
Stoilović's home team is OK Crvena Zvezda (Red Star) Belgrade, where he played for the first team between 2009 and 2015. In 2015 he went to Polish club Indykpol AZS Olsztyn. In January 2017, he signed for French side GFC Ajaccio.

Sporting achievements

Clubs

National championships
With OK Crvena Zvezda Belgrade:
 2008/2009  Serbian Cup
 2009/2010  Serbian Championship
 2010/2011  Serbian Cup
 2010/2011  Serbian Championship
 2011/2012  Serbian SuperCup 2011
 2011/2012  Serbian Championship
 2012/2013  Serbian SuperCup 2012
 2012/2013  Serbian Cup
 2012/2013  Serbian Championship
 2013/2014  Serbian SuperCup 2013
 2013/2014  Serbian Cup
 2013/2014  Serbian Championship
 2014/2015  Serbian SuperCup 2014
 2014/2015  Serbian Championship

National team
 2013  FIVB U23 World Championship

Individually
 2013 FIVB U23 WorldChampionship - Best Outside Spiker

References

1992 births
Living people
Place of birth missing (living people)
Serbian men's volleyball players
European Games competitors for Serbia
Volleyball players at the 2015 European Games
Serbian expatriate sportspeople in France
Expatriate volleyball players in France
AZS Olsztyn players
Serbian expatriate sportspeople in Poland
Serbian expatriate sportspeople in Turkey
Serbian expatriate sportspeople in Romania
Expatriate volleyball players in Romania